Kappa Phi Gamma Sorority, Inc. (also referred to as KPhiG), is the first South Asian interest sorority geared towards women of all descents. It was founded on November 8, 1998, by a group of 27 women from a variety of different backgrounds at the University of Texas at Austin, in Austin, Texas.

History 

On November 8, 1998, 27 women from a myriad of backgrounds came together to form the first South-Asian interest sorority. Although, South-Asian founded, she has expanded the warmth of her Sisterhood to any and all motivated young women, willing to make a difference at her University and community.

Today 
Each chapter and charter is engaged in programs generally selected in accordance with the following areas: professional development, philanthropic aid, Greek solidarity, education, health, the arts, and cultural awareness.

Such involvement includes but is not limited to the following: Leadership retreats, South Asian Student Alliance, Relay for Life, National Conference, NAPA Conference, chapter/charter and regional formals, Be the Change, and Meet the Greeks. The topics of the workshops and forums that have been led by Kappa Phi Gamma include but are not limited to: leadership skills, finance, cultural awareness, rape culture, women's empowerment, business etiquette, GRE/MCAT/OAT/DAT preparation, resume building/interview preparation, risk management, hazing prevention, stress relief, healthy lifestyles, cancer awareness, social media etiquette, crafts, and self cultivation.

Philanthropy 

Kappa Phi Gamma Sororities render service to the community and respective campuses. Since her inception in November 1998, the Sisterhood has participated in a variety of service projects. However, the sisterhood has dedicated itself to its national philanthropy, cancer awareness. The founders discovered, that in one way or another, almost all of them had been affected by cancer. They realized that cancer does not discriminate by race, sex, or class; it can affect anyone. For those reasons, the founders chose to devote our philanthropy for cancer awareness.

Every Spring, Kappa Phi Gamma around the nation plans Cancer Awareness: a Real Effort! (C.A.R.E.) Week. C.A.R.E Week is a week long series of events dedicated to raising funds for a cancer organization and to bring awareness to the community about cancer. To date, Kappa Phi Gamma has raised over $70,000 and has donated their services to over 40 different charities. C.A.R.E. Week has been recognized by the Asian Cup Award for being the only organization of its kind to commit a week of events towards cancer awareness, while incorporating educational and entertaining activities in order to educate the public about early detection and prevention of cancer.

All proceeds raised during C.A.R.E. Week are donated to organizations that are committed to cancer awareness.

Scholarship 
The Emerald Endowment is an annual scholarship awarded by the sorority to a female student not associated with the sorority who has demonstrated excellence in scholarship, leadership, and service.

Chapters and Charters
Chapters of Kappa Phi Gamma include the following.  Active chapters noted in bold, inactive chapters noted in italics.
Chapters:

 Alpha (Founding) chapter - University of Texas at Austin 
 Beta chapter - University of Texas at Dallas
 Gamma chapter - Baylor University
 Delta chapter - University of Houston
 Zeta chapter - University of Maryland at College Park
 Theta chapter - Virginia Commonwealth University
 Iota chapter - Temple University 
 Lambda chapter - George Mason University 
 Mu chapter - University of the Sciences in Philadelphia
 Nu chapter - Drexel University 
 Omicron chapter - Rutgers University-New Brunswick
 Sigma chapter - New Jersey Institute of Technology

Charters:

 Epsilon charter - Boston University
 Eta charter - New York, New York
 Pi charter - New York Institute of Technology-Old Westbury
 Rho charter - Rutgers University-Newark
 Tau charter - University of Massachusetts Amherst
 Upsilon charter - University of Connecticut
 Phi charter - Adelphi University

References

Asian-American culture in Austin, Texas
Student societies in the United States
Asian-American fraternities and sororities
Indian-American culture in Texas
Organizations established in 1998
South Asian American culture